John De Camborne Paynter,  (17 May 1898 – 6 June 1918) was a British flying ace of the First World War, credited with 10 aerial victories while flying with the Royal Naval Air Service. He was awarded the Distinguished Service Cross for his valour before being killed in a bombing raid.

Early life
Paynter was born in Southsea, Hampshire, on 17 May 1898. His mother was Alexandra Laura Paynter.

First World War
Paynter joined the Royal Naval Air Service (RNAS) in early 1916 as a probationary temporary flight sub-lieutenant, and was confirmed in his rank on 25 June 1916. He served in both No. 6 and No. 10 Naval Squadrons, before being injured in a flying accident on 9 April 1917. After his recovery, he flew with No. 9 Naval Squadron; it was while flying with them that he scored his first aerial victory on 27 October 1917. He then transferred to No. 13 Naval Squadron; he would remain with them through their transition to No. 213 Squadron RAF. On 5 December 1917, he scored a win with them.

On 1 January 1918, Paynter was promoted to flight lieutenant. He also scored three wins in the early months of 1918. After a break, he scored the remainder of his victories in May and early June 1918. While doing this, he was wounded in action on two occasions.

Paynter died on 6 June 1918 from wounds suffered during a German bombing raid on his squadron's aerodrome at Bergues, France. He is buried in Plot IV. A. 78 in Dunkirk Town Cemetery, France. He is also memorialised at Saint Peter's Church, Somerstown, Portsmouth, on a plaque located under the organ loft.

Distinguished Service Cross
As his award citation shows, Paynter performed admirably in air-to-ground combat as well as in the air:

List of aerial victories

See also
 Aerial victory standards of World War I
 List of World War I aces credited with 10 victories

References

1898 births
1918 deaths
People from Southsea
British World War I flying aces
Royal Naval Air Service aviators
Royal Air Force personnel of World War I
Recipients of the Distinguished Service Cross (United Kingdom)
British military personnel killed in World War I
Deaths by airstrike during World War I
Military personnel from Portsmouth